Abdopus abaculus, or the mosaic octopus, is a species of pygmy octopus. It was first described as Octopus abaculus by M. D. Norman and M. J. Sweeney in 1997 based on specimens caught in Zamboanga del Norte, Philippines.

Distribution 
A. abaculus is found in the Philippines, and has also been reported in Tonga and Japan. It is found at depths of zero to five meters.

References 

Octopodidae
Molluscs described in 1997